The Chiesa di San Nicolao is a church in Milan, Italy. It was originally built in 1259.

Notes

Buildings and structures completed in 1259
Nicolao